= Volleyball World Championships =

Volleyball World Championships may refer to

- FIVB Volleyball Men's World Championship
- FIVB Volleyball Women's World Championship
